FIPPA is an acronym which may refer to:
 Federation of International Pitch and Putt Associations, the first-established of the two global governing bodies of pitch and putt
 Freedom of Information and Protection of Privacy Act, Canadian provincial legislation
 Foreign investment promotion and protection agreement, any of numerous investment agreements between Canada and other countries